Peter Ralph Eckhardt (born 10 September 1960 in Melbourne) is an Australian slalom canoeist who competed from the mid-1980s the early 1990s. He finished 20th in the C-1 event at the 1992 Summer Olympics in Barcelona.

References
Sports-reference.com profile

1960 births
Australian male canoeists
Canoeists at the 1992 Summer Olympics
Living people
Olympic canoeists of Australia